Alibaba Marjinaa is a 1977 Bollywood film directed by Kedar Kapoor. The film stars Prem Krishen as Alibaba and Tamanna as Marjina.

Plot 
The movie is loosely based on the Arabian Nights tale of Alibaba and 40 Thieves but takes only a few plot elements from the source.

Cast
Prem Krishen as Alibaba
Tamanna as Marjinaa
Urmila Bhatt as Alibaba's mother
Birbal as Gulfam
Jagdeep as Mustafa (Cobbler)
Pinchoo Kapoor as Hakim-e-Aala Afsal Baig
Shakti Kapoor as Nasir
Javed Khan
Viju Khote as Qasim
Madhu Malhotra as Naseem
Ram Mohan as Taimur Baig
Paintal as Khairu
Amrish Puri as Jabbar
D.K. Sapru as Badshah
Sharat Saxena as Aslam
 Sajjan
 Murad
 Anand Joshi
 Rajan Kapoor
 Kirti Kumar
 Jugnu
 Pardesi
 Ravi Kotru
 Chandu Allhabadi
 Ghanshyam
 Ravi Joshi
 Ritu Kamal
 Madhu Chauhan
 Shushma Pandit
 Uma Dhawan

Crew

 Directed by Kedaar Kapoor
 Music: Usha Khanna
 Screenplay and dialogue: Kulwant Jaani
 Cinematography: Arvind Laad
 Audiography: Shashikant Avsare
 Editing: Mukhtar Ahmed
 Art: Kartk Bose
 Dances: Sohanlal
 Fight composer: S Burhan
 Makeup: S. Jayanta

Sargam Pictures’

Soundtrack
Speed: 33rpm
Record No. 2392 140
Record Label: Polydor
Music by: Usha Khanna
Lyrics by: Kulwant Jani

Pressed in India

Side One 
1. "Main Alibaba" - K. J. Yesudas
2. "Basre Ki Hur" – Asha Bhosle
3. "Aaye Jo Kisi Ke Kaam" – Shailendra Singh
4. "Main Hoon Kafir Mast Hasina" – Asha Bhosle and Anuradha

Side Two 
1. "Hai Hai Hai Maar Dala" – Shatrugan Sinha and Sulakshana Pandit
2. "Gulbadan Aa Gayee" – Asha Bhosle
3. "Aa Gaya Diwana" – Yesudas
4. "Gulistan Se" – Asha Bhosle

External links
 

Alibaba Marjinaa (1977) movie database websites
 CITWF
 IMinDb.com

Alibaba Marjinaa (1977) songs database websites
 Hindi Geet Mala   
 MySwar   
 Earthmusic Network   
 Hindi Movies Songs, Videos & Lyrics
 YouTube
 Fun Vills
 indianfilmdatabase.com

Bollywood Film Alibaba Marjinaa (1977) lyrics database websites
 Hindi lyrics.net
 Lyrster

1977 films
Films scored by Usha Khanna
1970s Hindi-language films
Films based on Ali Baba
Films based on One Thousand and One Nights